is a Japanese rally driver. Since his debut in 1967, his greatest successes have been as a works driver for Mitsubishi Motors. Behind the wheel of a Galant VR-4 he won the Asia-Pacific Rally Championship in 1988 and scored consecutive victories in the Rallye Côte d'Ivoire Bandama in 1991 and 1992, when it was a round of the World Rally Championship, making him the first Japanese competitor to win a WRC event. He is also of note for his success in the Dakar Rally, where he became the first Japanese winner of the world's most famous endurance rally in 1997 driving a Mitsubishi Pajero.

Shinozuka resigned from Mitsubishi in 2002, but continued to compete. He drove a Nissan pickup in the 2003 Dakar, but after hitting a sand dune he rolled his vehicle several times, enduring severe facial injuries and being placed in a coma. His co-driver Thierry Delli-Zotti suffered fractures to both his legs, although unlike Shinuzoka his injuries were not life-threatening.

Shinuzoka announced before the 2006 event that it would be his final appearance as a competitor, saying "[m]y decision has been taken: it’s my last Dakar. But I still hope to enjoy myself one last time behind the steering wheel. To win? No, that’s not my goal. After that, I don’t yet know what I’ll do but I do know that we need new talents in Japan. Just look at our drivers, they're all sixty or over, like Asaga san or Sugawara san… So I might help out in finding new promising competitors for the future." However, despite this, he returned for the 2007 Dakar, again driving a Nissan, and finished in 59th place out of the 109 cars that finished the race.

WRC victories
{|class="wikitable"
!  # 
! Event
! Season
! Co-driver
! Car
|-
| 1
|  23ème Rallye Côte d'Ivoire Bandama
| 1991
| John Meadows
| Mitsubishi Galant VR-4
|-
| 2
|  24ème Rallye Côte d'Ivoire Bandama
| 1992
| John Meadows
| Mitsubishi Galant VR-4
|}

Dakar Rally results

References

External links
  

1948 births
Living people
Mitsubishi Motors people
Sportspeople from Tokyo
Japanese rally drivers
Off-road racing drivers
Dakar Rally drivers
Dakar Rally winning drivers
World Rally Championship drivers